Shaque is a 1976 Bollywood drama film directed by Aruna-Vikas. The film stars Vinod Khanna, Shabana Azmi and Utpal Dutt.

Plot
Vinod Joshi lives a middle-class existence with his wife, Meena, and a young son. He would like to improve upon his living conditions and ensure that his child enjoys life thoroughly. One day Vinod returns home in a bloodied state, and tells Meena that there has been a homicide at his place of work, and a large amount of money has been stolen. The police are called in to investigate, and as a result a fellow-employee by the name of Subramaniam is arrested and sentenced to jail. Then the Joshi family gets wealthy all of a sudden, and move to a different and more spacious location, and start enjoying their lives to the fullest. Meena finds out that another co-worker of Vinod's, Maan Singh, has been telling people that Vinod was the one who stole the money, and also killed the employee in the process. Meena goes to meet Maan Singh to confirm this, and he does so, and even writes a letter to her to that effect, and threatens to inform the police. When Meena confronts Vinod, he vehemently denies ever stealing nor killing anyone, but has no explanation to offer for their new-found wealth. As Meena attempts to trace the origin of this wealth, and gets more and more convinced about his guilt, she and Vinod finds themselves growing further apart from each other, and Meena coming to the shocking conclusion that she has been sleeping with someone who may have killed another human being. Then Maan Singh's girlfriend, Rosita, is killed. The police find Vinod's fingerprints on the knife. Upon seeing the police, Vinod asks Meena to get ready to run, which they do, with the police in hot chase after them. 
How long will Vinod continue to elude the police?
Did he really commit those murders?

Cast
Vinod Khanna as Vinod Joshi 
Shabana Azmi as Meena Joshi 
Utpal Dutt as Maan Singh 
Bindu as Rosita 
Durga Khote as Mrs. Banerjee in guest appearance
Farida Jalal as Mrs. Subramaniam in guest appearance
Arvind Deshpande as Subramaniam 
Suhas Bhalekar as Bhalekar
Master Atul as Mithu, Vinod and Meena's son
Satya Kumar Patil as Police Inspector
J.K.Banerjee as Mr Banerjee aka Kakaji

Also featuring in the supporting cast :- Nirmala Mathan, Onkar, Ninad Deshpande, Sunita, Ramji Koli, Padmakar Athavale, Balmukund Prabhu and Gopal Nair.

Awards 
25th Filmfare Awards:

Nominated

 Best Actor – Vinod Khanna
 Best Supporting Actress – Farida Jalal

Soundtrack

References

External links
 

1976 films
1970s Hindi-language films
1976 drama films
Indian drama films
Indian courtroom films
Hindi-language drama films
Films directed by Aruna Raje